Trichal is a village in Pulwama district, Jammu & Kashmir, India. As per the 2011 Census of India, Trichal village has a total population of 2,915 including 1,528 males and 1,387 females with a literacy rate of 54.27%. There is one private high school and one  Government middle school in the village. Most common activities in the village is related to Hoticulture and agriculture.

References 

Villages in Pulwama district